Ithomisa is a genus of moths in the family Saturniidae first described by Charles Oberthür in 1881.

Species
Ithomisa catherina (Schaus, 1896)
Ithomisa kinkelini Ch. Oberthuer, 1881
Ithomisa lepta (Druce, 1890)
Ithomisa umbrata Oiticica Filho, 1958

References

Hemileucinae